Hugh Martin Murray (3 May 1912 – 6 January 2003) was a Scottish international rugby union player, who played for  at centre. He was capped twice in 1936. He was born in Coatbridge.

References
 player profile on scrum.com

1912 births
2003 deaths
Rugby union players from Coatbridge
Scotland international rugby union players
Scottish rugby union players
Rugby union centres